Carlos Alberto Alvarado (born 2 April 1945) is an Argentine equestrian. He competed in two events at the 1972 Summer Olympics.

References

External links

1945 births
Living people
Argentine male equestrians
Olympic equestrians of Argentina
Equestrians at the 1972 Summer Olympics
Place of birth missing (living people)